Elk Creek is an  tributary of the Rogue River in the U.S. state of Oregon. Elk Creek Dam, an incomplete flood-control structure that blocked fish migration for more than 20 years, was partly demolished in 2008 to restore endangered anadromous fish passage.

Course
In its first  or so, Elk Creek receives Brush Creek from the left, Swanson and Bitter Lick creeks from the right, and Button Creek from the left. From here to the creek mouth, Elk Creek Road runs parallel to the stream along its right bank. Thereafter, Dodes Creek enters from the left and Sugarpine, Jones, Shell, and Flat creeks from the right. Near river mile (RM) 7 or river kilometer (RK) 11, Middle Creek enters from the right, and shortly thereafter Alco Creek also enters from the right. Below the dam, the creek passes a United States Geological Survey (USGS) stream gauge, which is on the right at RM 1.3 (RK 2.1). Shortly thereafter, Berry Creek enters from the right. The creek then passes Rogue Elk County Park, which is on the left, flows under Crater Lake Highway / Oregon Route 62, and enters the Rogue River  from its mouth on the Pacific Ocean.

Dam
It was one of three dams authorized by Congress in 1962 to help control flooding along the Rogue River. The other two were the Lost Creek Dam, later renamed the William L. Jess Dam, on the Rogue main stem, and the Applegate Dam on the Applegate River. When the Elk Creek Dam was about one-third finished, lawsuits to protect endangered salmon and other migratory fish led to a court injunction that stopped construction in 1987. After 1992, fish trying to swim past the dam were trapped and hauled around it in trucks. Litigation and political battles lasting more than 20 years led to the compromise of demolishing about 15 percent of the dam and leaving the rest intact so that it might be restored in the future. In 2008, the United States Army Corps of Engineers dismantled part of the dam with explosives and restored the creek to its original channel.

See also
List of rivers of Oregon

References

External links
Rogue Basin Partnership

Rivers of Oregon
Rogue River (Oregon)
Rivers of Jackson County, Oregon
Rogue River-Siskiyou National Forest
Dams in Oregon
Wild and Scenic Rivers of the United States